Out of the Blue is the ninth studio album by English pop rock group Mike + The Mechanics that was released on 5 April 2019 by BMG. The album features reworkings of some of their greatest hits along with three new tracks ("One Way", "Out of the Blue", and "What Would You Do").

The album debuted at number 7 on the UK Albums Chart, selling 7,591 copies in the first week. It is Mike + The Mechanics' fifth top 10 album in the United Kingdom.

Track listing

Personnel 
Mike & the Mechanics
 Mike Rutherford – bass, backing vocals, drum programming, Akai drum programming
 Anthony Drennan – lead guitars, bass, backing vocals 
 Tim Howar – vocals
 Andrew Roachford – keyboards, vocals 
 Luke Juby – keyboards 
 Gary Wallis – drums 

Additional musicians
 Paul Meehan – keyboards (1, 2), programming (1, 2)
 Clark Datchler – keyboards (3)

Production 
 Paul Meehan – producer 
 Mike Rutherford – producer, mixing, artwork concept, design 
 Harry Rutherford – recording 
 Nick Davis – mixing 
 Dick Beetham (360 Mastering) – mastering 
 Jo Greenwood – project coordinator
 Darren Evans – artwork concept, design 
 Martin Griffin – digital imagery 
 Patrick "Paddy" Balls – photography

Charts

References

Mike + The Mechanics albums
2019 albums
BMG Rights Management albums
Albums produced by Mike Rutherford